Jaleswar railway station is a railway station on the South Eastern Railway network in the state of Odisha, India. It serves Jaleswar town. Its code is JER. It has four platforms. Passenger, Express and Superfast trains halt at Jaleswar railway station.

Major Trains

 Kalinga Utkal Express
 Sri Jagannath Express
 Dhauli Express
 East Coast Express
 Simlipal Intercity Express
 Ernakulam - Patna Express (via Chennai)
 Samudra Kanya Express
 Digha - Visakhapatnam Express
 Santragachi - Paradeep Express
 Nandan Kanan Express
 Odisha Sampark Kranti Express
 Bhubaneswar - Howrah Jan Shatabdi Express
 Neelachal Express
 Shalimar - Chennai Central Weekly SF Express
 Santragachi - Mangalore Central Vivek Express
 Purulia - Villupuram Superfast Express
 Santragachi - Tirupati Express

References

See also
 Balasore district

Railway stations in Balasore district
Kharagpur railway division